The Two Towers, both leaning, are symbols of Bologna, Italy, and the most prominent of the Towers of Bologna. They are located at the intersection of the roads that lead to the five gates of the old ring wall (mura dei torresotti). The taller one is called the Asinelli while the smaller but more leaning tower is called the Garisenda. Their names derive from the families which are traditionally credited with having constructed the towers between 1109 and 1119. 

Their construction may have been a competition between the two families to show which was the more powerful family. However, the scarcity of documents from this early period makes this uncertain. The name of the Asinelli family, for example, is documented for the first time actually only in 1185, almost 70 years after the presumed construction of the tower which is attributed to them.

Asinelli Tower

It is believed that the Asinelli Tower initially had a height of ca.  and was raised only later to the current , with an overhanging battlement of 2.2 m (6.6 ft). In the 14th century the city became its owner and used it as a prison and small stronghold. During this period a wooden construction was added around the tower at a height of roughly 30 metres (about 100 feet) above ground, which was connected with an aerial footbridge (later destroyed during a fire in 1398) to the Garisenda Tower. Its addition is attributed to Giovanni Visconti, Duke of Milan, who allegedly wanted to use it to control the turbulent Mercato di Mezzo (today via Rizzoli) and suppress possible revolts. The Visconti had become the rulers of Bologna after the decline of the Signoria of the Pepoli family, but were rather unpopular in the city.

Severe damage was caused by lightning that often resulted in small fires and collapses, and only in 1824 was a lightning rod installed. The tower survived, however, at least two documented large fires: the first in 1185 was due to arson and the second one in 1398.

The Asinelli Tower was used by the scientists Giovanni Battista Riccioli (in 1640) and Giovanni Battista Guglielmini (in the following century) for experiments to study the motion of heavy bodies and the earth rotation. In World War II, between 1943 and 1945, it was used as a sight post: During bombing attacks, four volunteers took post at the top to direct rescue operations to places hit by Allied bombs. Later, a RAI television relay was installed on top. Architect Minoru Yamasaki is thought to have been inspired by the Towers when designing the World Trade Center during the 1960s.

The Asinelli Tower was also the tallest structure in the world, surpassing the Lincoln Cathedral, until it was surpassed by St. Stephen's Cathedral in 1197. [6]

Garisenda Tower
Initially, it was approximately 60 metres (about 200 feet) high, but had to be lowered in the 14th century due to a yielding of the ground which left it slanting and dangerous. In the early 15th century, the tower was bought by the Arte dei Drappieri, which remained the sole owner until the Garisenda became municipal property at the end of the 19th century.

It was cited several times by Dante in the Divine Comedy and The Rime (a confirmation of his stay in Bologna), and by Goethe in his Italian Journey. The Two Towers have also been the subject of an eponymous poem by Giosuè Carducci as part of the Barbarian Odes. Charles Dickens wrote about the towers in his Pictures from Italy and Antal Szerb wrote about them in The Third Tower: Journeys in Italy.

References

External links
Official website

Inclined towers
Towers in Bologna
Towers completed in the 12th century
Twin towers
1119 establishments in Europe
12th-century establishments in Italy